The Tour de Romandie is a stage race which is part of the UCI World Tour. It runs through the Romandie region, or French-speaking part of Switzerland. The competition began in 1947, to coincide with the 50-year anniversary of Swiss Cycling. It was held without interruption until the COVID-19 pandemic caused the cancellation of the 2020 edition.

The course of the race usually heads northwards towards the Jura mountains and Alpine mountain ranges of western Switzerland. The race traditionally starts with an individual time trial prologue and ends with an individual time-trial in hilly terrains, often in Lausanne. The final time-trial traditionally starts in the stadium north of Lausanne, goes downhill southwards to Lake Léman (Lake Geneva), and makes its way back uphill to the stadium again.  The winner and several of the top-ten finishers are usually excellent time trialists.

Four winners of the Tour de Romandie had gone on to win the Tour de France in the same year; Stephen Roche in 1987, then Cadel Evans, Bradley Wiggins and Chris Froome in 2011, 2012 and 2013, respectively.

Tour de Romandie is also usually considered a preparation race for the Giro d'Italia, which starts one week later.

In 2022, the Tour de Romandie Féminin was held for the first time in the UCI Women's World Tour – as part of the 75th anniversary celebrations of the race.

Winners

Multiple winners

Wins per country

Most stage wins

See also
 List of highest paved roads in Switzerland

References

Notes

As of 1 March 2022, the UCI announced that cyclists from Russia and Belarus would no longer compete under the name or flag of those respective countries due to the Russian invasion of Ukraine.

External links

  
 

 
UCI ProTour races
Cycle races in Switzerland
Recurring sporting events established in 1947
1947 establishments in Switzerland
UCI World Tour races
Annual sporting events in Switzerland
Spring (season) events in Switzerland
Super Prestige Pernod races